Michael C. Goode, known professionally as Mike Dimes is an American rapper and singer from San Antonio, Texas. He is known for his single "My Story" which received traction on TikTok.

Early life 
Michael Goode, stage name "Mike Dimes" was born into a military family, moving across the United States of America, traveling to states as of Colorado & South Carolina, before settling back In his home state of Texas where he moved to San Antonio, Texas In his sophomore year of high school, later on he dropped his passions for basketball and baseball and decided to pursue a passion of music.

Career

2021: Breakthrough
In 2021, Goode came to prominence with the success of his single "My Story" on TikTok. It received around 2 billion views on the platform.

2022-present
In January 2022, he was selected by Spotify as one of their 10 Most Necessary Artists to Watch in 2022. In June 2022, he remixed his hit single "Home" with a feature from JID. Also in June 2022, he appeared on American rapper Jeleel's single titled "Clubhouse".

Artistry
Mike Dimes main influences include ASAP Rocky and Joey Badass.

Discography

Studio albums

References

External links 
 

Living people
21st-century American rappers
Alternative R&B musicians
African-American male rappers
People from Texas
Year of birth missing (living people)